Gillespie House may refer to:

in the United States (by state then city)
Gillespie House (Sarasota, Florida), listed on the NRHP in Sarasota County
Gillespie-Jackson House, Starkville, Mississippi, listed on the NRHP in Oktibbeha County
Gillespie House (Guilderland, New York), listed on the NRHP in Albany County
Col. George Gillespie House, Limestone, Tennessee, listed on the NRHP in Washington County
James Gillespie House, Louisville, Tennessee, listed on the NRHP in Blount County